Ester Mägi (10 January 1922 – 14 May 2021) was an Estonian composer, widely regarded as the First Lady of Estonian Music.

Biography 
Her compositional output is substantial and represents all genres, from chamber and vocal music to choral and highly regarded symphonic works. She trained initially under Mart Saar at the Tallinn Conservatory, then from 1951 to 1954 at the Moscow Conservatory under Vissarion Shebalin. Amongst her best-known works are her Piano Sonata (1949), Piano Trio in F minor (1950), Piano Concerto (1953), Violin Concerto (1958), Symphony (1968), Variations for Piano, Clarinet and Chamber Orchestra (1972), Bukoolika for orchestra (1983) and Vesper for violin and piano/organ (1990, arranged for strings in 1998). Much of her work has been inspired by Estonian folk music. Mägi died in May 2021 at the age of 99.

References

External links 
 Bio of Ester Mägi by Urve Lippus on the Toccata Classics website
 CD release of Mägi's orchestral music
 Ester Mägi at the Estonian Music Information Centre
 Ester Mägi (1922) (Music Export Estonia)
 Chamber Players chip away at more barriers with Baltic Voices (Seattle Post-Intelligencer)
 

1922 births
2021 deaths
20th-century classical composers
21st-century classical composers
Soviet composers
Women classical composers
Recipients of the Order of the National Coat of Arms, 5th Class
Musicians from Tallinn
Estonian Academy of Music and Theatre alumni
Moscow Conservatory alumni
20th-century Estonian musicians
20th-century Estonian composers
20th-century women composers
21st-century women composers